The Sandringham line is a commuter railway line in the city of Melbourne, Victoria, Australia. The line runs from Flinders Street station in central Melbourne to Sandringham station in the south-east, serving 14 stations via South Yarra, Balaclava, Elsternwick, and Brighton. The line operates for approximately 20 hours a day (from approximately 5:30 am to around 12:20 am) with 24 hour service available on Friday and Saturday nights. During peak hour, headways of up to 5 to 10 minutes are operated with services every 10-20 minutes during off-peak hours. Trains on the Sandringham line run with a two three-car formations of Siemens Nexas train sets.

Sections of the Sandringham line opened as early as 1859, with the line fully extended to Sandringham in 1887. A limited number of stations were first opened, with infill stations progressively opened between 1860 and 1912. The line was built to connect Melbourne with the suburbs of Balaclava, Elsternwick, Brighton, and Sandringham, amongst others. Minor upgrades have occurred since its opening, including historical level crossing removal works and regular infrastructure upgrades.

History

19th century 
The Melbourne and Suburban Railway Company opened their line from Princes Bridge (later amalgamated with Flinders Street station) to a temporary station on Punt Road in February 1859, then to Cremorne (now closed) in December of that year. Shortly after, the St Kilda and Brighton Railway Company opened their railway line from St Kilda to Bay Street (now North Brighton) in December 1859. Twelve months after that, the Melbourne and Suburban Railway Company extended their line from Cremorne to Chapel Street (now Windsor) station, on the St Kilda and Brighton Railway Company's line, providing a second route to the city from the Brighton line. The following year, again in December, the St Kilda and Brighton Railway Company extended their line to Beach (now Brighton Beach).

The link between St Kilda and Windsor, disused since 1862, was dismantled in 1867, although part of it at the Windsor end was used as a siding for some time afterwards. In 1865, the Melbourne and Hobson's Bay Railway Company, who owned the St Kilda line, purchased the Melbourne Suburban Railway Company and became the Melbourne and Hobson's Bay United Railway Company, and subsequently bought the St Kilda and Brighton Railway Company, which was in financial difficulties, for £99,500. The Victorian Government acquired the United railway company in July 1878.

In September 1887, the Brighton line was extended to Sandringham.

20th century 

The Sandringham line became the first line in Victoria to be provided with automatic signals, with the line as far as Elsternwick converted in stages from 1915 to 1918. Then in 1919, the Sandringham line became, with the line to Essendon, the first line in the country to be electrified (apart from a test installation on the Flemington Racecourse line). Automatic signalling was provided the rest of the way to Sandringham in two stages in during 1926.

When the underground City Loop line was designed, it was not intended to cater for trains on the Port Melbourne, St Kilda, and Sandringham lines. However, a crossover was installed near Richmond to allow Sandringham trains to cross to the tracks used by the Frankston, Pakenham, and Cranbourne line trains, which had access to the underground loop. In 1985, two Sandringham trains each way were altered to run via the underground loop, and in 1987, with the Port Melbourne and St Kilda lines converted to light rail operation, all off-peak and many peak trains were routed via the underground loop. The commencement of operations involved the service stopping at three new stations—Parliament, Melbourne Central (formally Museum), and Flagstaff. The Loop follows La Trobe and Spring Streets along the northern and eastern edges of the Hoddle Grid. The Loop connects with Melbourne's two busiest stations, Flinders Street and Southern Cross, via the elevated Flinders Street Viaduct. From 2021, Sandringham line services stopped operating through the loop as part of a timetable restructure.

21st century 

In 2021, the metropolitan timetable underwent a major rewrite, resulting in all Sandringham line trains terminating at Flinders Street without operating through the City Loop.

Future

Network reconfiguration 
When the new cross-city rail corridor being built by the Metro Tunnel opens in 2025 there will be a reorganisation of the Melbourne rail network. The Victorian Department of Transport and Planning plans to return the Frankston line to the City Loop, with dedicated use of the Caulfield group tunnel track. This will mean Frankston line trains will no longer through-run with Werribee and Williamstown line trains, and will again stop at City Loop stations Flagstaff, Melbourne Central and Parliament. As part of the reconfiguration, the Sandringham line would instead begin through-running services to Werribee and Williamstown for the first time.

Stage 4 of the Network Development Plan [for] Metropolitan Rail proposed that the Upfield and Sandringham lines be joined via a reconfigured City Loop sometime in the 2030s.

Network and operations

Services 
Services on the Sandringham line operates from approximately 5:30 am to around 12:20 am daily. In general, during peak hours, train frequency is 5-10 minutes while services during non-peak hours drops to 10–20 minutes throughout the entire route (except on Sunday mornings when services run every 40 minutes till 9:30 am). Services don't run through the City Loop, instead terminating at Flinders Street. On Friday nights and weekends, services run 24 hours a day, with 60 minute frequencies available outside of normal operating hours.

Train services on the Sandringham line are also subjected to maintenance and renewal works, usually on selected Fridays and Saturdays. Shuttle bus services are provided throughout the duration of works for affected commuters.

Stopping patterns 
Legend — Station status
 ◼ Premium Station – Station staffed from first to last train
 ◻ Host Station – Usually staffed during morning peak, however this can vary for different stations on the network.

Legend — Stopping patternsServices do not operate via the City Loop
 ● – All trains stop
 ◐ – Some services do not stop
 ▲ – Only inbound trains stop
 | – Trains pass and do not stop

Operators 
The Sandringham line has had a total of 10 operators since its opening in 1859. The majority of operations throughout its history have been government run: from its nationalisation in 1878 until the 1997 privatisation of Melbourne's rail network, three different government operators have run the line. These operators, Victorian Railways, the Metropolitan Transit Authority, and the Public Transport Corporation have a combined operational length of 119 years. In comparison, there have been a total of seven private operators over two time periods. The line was initially operated by the Melbourne and Suburban Railway Company, the St Kilda and Brighton Railway Company, the Melbourne Railway Company, and the Melbourne and Hobson's Bay Railway Company over the course of 19 years from 1859 till 1878. After the network privatisation of 1997, a total of three companies have been contracted to operate the line totalling  years of operation. M-Train, Connex Melbourne, and Metro Trains Melbourne have all operated the line since 1997.

*Operated part of the route

Route 

The Sandringham line forms a somewhat linear route with minor curves from the Melbourne central business district to its terminus in Sandringham. After departing from its terminus at Flinders Street, the Sandringham line traverses mainly flat country with few curves and fairly minimal earthworks for most of the line. However, sections of the line have been elevated or lowering into a cutting to eliminate level crossings. Despite historical removals, there are numerous level crossings still present on the line with no current plans to remove them.

The line follows the same alignment as the Cranbourne, Pakenham, and Frankston lines with the four services splitting onto different routes at South Yarra. The Sandringham line continues on its south eastern alignment, whereas the Cranbourne, Pakenham, and Frankston lines takes an eastern alignment towards their final destinations. From Balaclava, the line is never more than ~ from the eastern shore of Port Phillip. All of the rail line goes through built-up suburbs towards its terminus in Sandringham

Stations 
The line serves 14 stations across  of track. The stations are a mix of elevated, lowered, and ground level designs. The majority of stations are at ground level, with elevated or lowered stations constructed in conjunction with historical level crossing removals works.

Infrastructure

Rolling stock 

The Sandringham line uses Siemens Nexas electric multiple unit (EMU) trains operating in a two three-car configuration, with three doors per side on each carriage and can accommodate of up to 432 seated passengers in each six car configuration. The trains were originally built between 2002 and 2005 with a total of 72 three-car sets constructed. The trains are shared with 7 other metropolitan train lines and have been in service since 2003.

Alongside the passenger trains, Sandringham line tracks and equipment are maintained by a fleet of engineering trains. The four types of engineering trains are: the shunting train; designed for moving trains along non-electrified corridors and for transporting other maintenance locomotives, for track evaluation; designed for evaluating track and its condition, the overhead inspection train; designed for overhead wiring inspection, and the infrastructure evaluation carriage designed for general infrastructure evaluation. Most of these trains are repurposed locomotives previously used by V/Line, Metro Trains, and the Southern Shorthaul Railroad.

Accessibility 
In compliance with the Disability Discrimination Act of 1992, all stations that are new-built or rebuilt are fully accessible and comply with these guidelines. The majority of stations on the corridor are fully accessible, however, there are some stations that haven't been upgraded to meet these guidelines. These stations do feature ramps, however, they have a gradient greater than 1 in 14. Stations that are fully accessible feature ramps that have a gradient less than 1 in 14, have at-grade paths, or feature lifts. These stations typically also feature tactile boarding indicators, independent boarding ramps, wheelchair accessible myki barriers, hearing loops, and widened paths.

Individual upgrade projects designed around improving station accessibility have occurred in recent years, with works making significant strides in improving network accessibility, with more than 71% of Sandringham line stations classed as fully accessible.

Signalling 
The Sandringham line uses three position signalling which is widely used across the Melbourne train network. Three position signalling was first introduced in 1915, with the final section of the line converted to the new type of signalling in 1926. The Sandringham line was the first line in Victoria to be equipped with this technology and was also the first (along with part of the Craigieburn line) to have a regular electric service.

References

External links
 Sandringham line timetable
 Network map
 

Railway lines in Melbourne
Railway lines opened in 1857
1857 establishments in Australia
Transport in the City of Yarra
Public transport routes in the City of Melbourne (LGA)
Transport in the City of Bayside
Transport in the City of Port Phillip
Transport in the City of Glen Eira